Martynovsky is a rural locality (a khutor) in Deminskoye Rural Settlement, Novoanninsky District, Volgograd Oblast, Russia. The population was 293 as of 2010. There are 5 streets.

Geography 
Martynovsky is located in steppe on the Khopyorsko-Buzulukskaya Plain, on the right bank of the Buzuluk River, 43 km west of Novoanninsky (the district's administrative centre) by road. Tavolzhansky is the nearest rural locality.

References 

Rural localities in Novoanninsky District